Timothy Philip Sugden (born 26 April 1964, in Bradford) is a British racing driver. He is both driver and manager for his own racing team, Tim Sugden Motorsport.

Early career

Sugden started racing in karting, where he became British champion. He soon moved up to Formula Ford 1600, winning the Star of Mallory series in 1987. Despite working on a small budget, he gained top place finishes at senior level FF1600 driving the works Swift "Tredaire" car for Frank Bradley. He also drove in the Honda CRX challenge and British Formula 3000. In 1990 he finished third in the Formula Renault Championship, with one race victory along the way.

BTCC

His first racing in the British Touring Car Championship came in 1990. He entered selected rounds for the Prodrive ran Junior BMW Team in the 2.0litre class. An impressive performance for the team in 1991 saw him win at Brands Hatch, finishing the year in tenth place, despite only competing in five rounds. This led to a full season in 1992 for the works BMW team, where he ended the year eighth on points. Prodrive's contract with BMW ended but Sugden was retained for 1993 by Prodrive for an abortive Mercedes entry and Sugden then returned to the series again in 1994. He entered selected rounds for the Toyota works team as a third driver alongside 1991 champion Will Hoy and former F1 driver Julian Bailey in a Toyota Carina. The team were not front runners in the championship, and another disappointing season followed in 1995, which was both Toyota's and Sugden's final year racing in the BTCC but he worked as test driver for Vauxhall in 1996 as they developed the Vectra.

GT Racing

Sugden's sports car racing career began in 1997 with an entry in the British GT Championship. In his first year, he won the GT2 title, alongside Steve O'Rourke in a Porsche 911 GT2. He then went on to win the GT1 titles in both 1998 and 1999, in a McLaren F1 GTR and a Lister Storm GTL, respectively. After already competing in the 24 Hours of Le Mans race (where he finished fourth overall in 1998 in the EMKA McLaren), he moved to full-time International GT racing in 2000 with the FIA GT Championship where he has 9 wins and was runner-up in the GT2 class in 2005. He was winner of the Porsche Cup in 2005, awarded by Porsche to the driver of any privately entered Porsche car in selected racing or rally championships worldwide where points are scored through the season according to the ranking of the series.   He is only the second British driver ever to win that Cup.   He has also competed in the American Le Mans Series in a Porsche, finishing second in GT2 in the Sebring 12 hours, the Daytona 24 Hours race, the Le Mans Series, and made a return to the British GT championship. In 2007, he was the Asian Porsche Carrera Cup champion, finished third in 2008 and finished second by 1 point in 2009.
In 2011 he finished 2nd in GT in the Daytona 24 hours driving a Porsche for Paul Miller Racing.

BriSCA F2 Stock Cars

On 9 October 2010 Tim won his debut F2 final in an evening race meeting at Skegness Stadium after working at Brands Hatch earlier that day getting an immediate upgrade to Yellow Top.   He is competing in selected F2 Stock car rounds this year(2010) and won the Grand National final at Birmingham in November.   In 2011 he entered the Northampton meeting on 13 March again winning the GN final and then the Birmingham meeting on the 19th when he won the Final and so was again upgraded to Blue Top.   In his first 6 meetings he has two overall wins and two GN wins but meetings limited due to other commitments. Hednesford on 10 April saw another win in a heat this time.

Racing record

Complete British Touring Car Championship results
(key) (Races in bold indicate pole position – 1990 in class) (Races in italics indicate fastest lap – 1990 in class)

 – Race was stopped due of heavy rain. No points were awarded.

24 Hours of Le Mans results

Complete Super GT results

Complete 24 Hours of Spa results

References

External links
Official Site. 

1964 births
Living people
English racing drivers
Formula Ford drivers
British Formula Renault 2.0 drivers
British Formula 3000 Championship drivers
American Le Mans Series drivers
British Touring Car Championship drivers
FIA GT Championship drivers
European Le Mans Series drivers
24 Hours of Le Mans drivers
24 Hours of Daytona drivers
Super GT drivers
24 Hours of Spa drivers
Porsche Carrera Cup GB drivers
British GT Championship drivers
BMW M drivers
CRS Racing drivers
Strakka Racing drivers
TOM'S drivers